Pleystowe is a rural locality in the Mackay Region, Queensland, Australia. In the  Pleystowe had a population of 371 people.

It is known for the Pleystowe Sugar Mill used to crush sugar cane to produce raw sugar.

History 
Pleystowe Provisional School opened on 15 April 1896. It became Pleystowe State School on 1 January 1909. It closed in 1961.

In the  Pleystowe had a population of 371 people.

See also
 List of tramways in Queensland

References

Mackay Region
Localities in Queensland